Khoi Dao (born September 3) is an American voice actor.

Filmography

Anime

Film

Video games

References

External links 

 
 
 

Living people
American video game actors
American voice actors
Vietnamese emigrants to the United States
21st-century American actors
Year of birth missing (living people)